San Luis is a village and resort of Costa de Oro in the Canelones Department of southern Uruguay.

Geography

Location
The village is located on Km. 63 of the Ruta Interbalnearia. It borders with the resorts Los Titanes to the east and Guazú - Virá to the west, with Arroyo del Bagre as the natural border with the later.

History
On 15 October 1963, its status was elevated to "Pueblo" (village) by the Act of Ley Nº 13.167.

Population
In 2011 San Luis had a population of 1,878.
 
Source: Instituto Nacional de Estadística de Uruguay

References

External links
INE map of San Luis, Araminda, Los Titanes, La Tuna and Guazú-Virá

Populated places in the Canelones Department
Seaside resorts in Uruguay